A plunger is a device that is used to release stoppages in plumbing.

Plunger may also refer to:

French press, a simple coffee brewing device
 A component of a syringe
Plunger (pinball), a spring-loaded rod used to launch balls in pinball
USS Plunger, several United States naval vessels
Plunger-class submarine, an early class of United States Navy submarines
Plunger lift, a natural gas well deliquification techniques
Plunger mute, the rubber part of a plumbing plunger, or a similar device, used as a musical mute
The Plungers, an obsolete nickname for the Household Cavalry

See also
 Plunge (disambiguation)